This is a list of films produced by the Ollywood film industry based in Bhubaneshwar and Cuttack in 1983:

A-Z

References

1983
Ollywood
Films, Ollywood
1980s in Orissa